Acromycter alcocki is an eel in the family Congridae (conger/garden eels). It was described by Charles Henry Gilbert and Frank Cramer in 1897, originally under the genus Promyllantor. It is a marine, deep water-dwelling eel which is known from Hawaii, in the eastern central Pacific Ocean. It dwells at a depth range of 388–640 metres. Males can reach a maximum total length of 25.3 centimetres.

References

Congridae
Taxa named by Charles Henry Gilbert
Taxa named by Frank Cramer
Fish described in 1897